The eastern forest bat (Vespadelus pumilus) is a species of vesper bat in the family Vespertilionidae. It is found only in Australia, where it has been recorded from Queensland to New South Wales. The population is in decline, with the number of mature individuals decreasing.

References

Bats of Australia
Vespadelus
Mammals of New South Wales
Mammals of Queensland
Mammals described in 1841
Taxonomy articles created by Polbot
Taxa named by John Edward Gray